TheatreWorks (Silicon Valley) is a non-profit, professional theater company based in Palo Alto, California.  Over its five decade history the company has produced more than 400 shows.

1970s

1970 season

1971 season

1972 season

1973–1974 season

1974–1975 season

1975–1976 season

1976–1977 season

1977–1978 season

1978–1979 season

1979–1980 season

1980s

1980–1981 season

1981–1982 season

1982–1983 season

1983–1984 season

1984–1985 season

1985–1986 season

1986–1987 season

1987–1988 season

1988–1989 season

1989–1990 season

1990s

1990–1991 season
The Mountain View Center for the Performing Arts opened in 1991, with TheatreWorks producing 5 shows in the venue.  The company also built their own black box theatre at the Cubberley Community Center in Palo Alto.

1991–1992 season

1992–1993 season

1993–1994 season

1994–1995 season

1995–1996 season

1996–1997 season

1997–1998 season

1998–1999 season

1999–2000 season

2000s

2000–2001 season

2001–2002 season

2002–2003 season

2003–2004 season

2004–2005 season

2005–2006 season

2006–2007 season

2007–2008 season

2008–2009 season

2009–2010 season

2010s

2010–2011 season

2011–2012 season

2012–2013 season

2013–2014 season

2014–2015 season

2015–2016 season

2016–2017 season

2017–2018 season

2018–2019 season

2019-2020 season

2021-2022 season

League of Resident Theatres
Lists of plays
Theatre companies in California
Theatre company production histories